Charles John Shore, 2nd Baron Teignmouth FRS (13 January 1796 – 18 September 1885) was a British Conservative politician.

Background and education

Charles John Shore was born in Calcutta in India, the son of John Shore, 1st Baron Teignmouth and Charlotte, only daughter of James Cornish, a medical practitioner at Teignmouth. He was educated at a private school in Clapham and, from 1808, a school in Chobham, Surrey. He then entered Trinity College, Cambridge, where he was the third President of the Cambridge Union Society.

On his death at 89 years of age he was buried in Dean Cemetery in western Edinburgh. The grave lies in the south-west spur.

Family

On 8 December 1838 he married Caroline fifth daughter of William Browne, of Tallantine Hall, Cumberland, who bore him three sons and three daughters. [5]

Political career
Lord Teignmouth served as MP for Marylebone from 1838 to 1841. He came third in the poll in the 1837 General Election, but took his seat on 3 March 1838, after Sir Samuel Whalley's election was declared void.

In June 1834 he was elected a Fellow of the Royal Society.

His autobiography, Reminiscences of Many Years, was published in 1878.

Arms

References

5. Burkes Peerage, 1949 Ed, Page 1964

Attribution

External links 
 

1796 births
1885 deaths
Barons in the Peerage of Ireland
Alumni of Trinity College, Cambridge
Presidents of the Cambridge Union
Conservative Party (UK) MPs for English constituencies
UK MPs 1837–1841
UK MPs who inherited peerages
Fellows of the Royal Society